Charles Chamberlain may refer to:
 Charles E. Chamberlain1988), U.S. Representative from Michigan
 Charles H. Chamberlain (1841–1894), Civil War veteran and author of the Illinois (state song)
 Charles Joseph Chamberlain (1863–1943), American botanist
 Charles R. Chamberlain (born 1969), American political leader